Komáří hůrka is one of the highest mountains in the Eastern Ore Mountains on the territory of the Czech Republic.

Location and surroundings 
Komáří hůrka lies northeast of Krupka (Graupen) and southeast of Cínovec (Böhmisch Zinnwald) immediately on the steepest section of the Ore Mountain escarpment. As a result, it is a good observation point, from which there are views in almost all directions of the compass. In addition the characteristic appearance of a fault block mountain range with its steep escarpment falling away to the south is very clearly seen from this part of the Ore Mountains.

Historic photo gallery

External links 

 Information about Komáří hůrka (aka Mückenberg)

Mountains and hills of the Czech Republic
Mining in the Ore Mountains
Mountains of the Ore Mountains
Mountains under 1000 metres